Óscar Manuel Ibáñez Holzmann (born 8 August 1967) is a former professional footballer who played as a goalkeeper. Born in Argentina, he represented the Peruvian national team and made his debut for the national team on 18 April 1998. Since then he obtained 50 caps, with the last match being on 30 March 2005. He has been one of the four to have played at least 500 games in the Peruvian First Division. He is of Volga German and Basque descent.

Honours
Universitario de Deportes
Primera División Peruana: 1998, 1999, 2000
Cienciano
Copa Sudamericana: 2003
Recopa Sudamericana: 2004

References

External links

RSSSF Archive

1967 births
Living people
People from Presidencia Roque Sáenz Peña
Argentine emigrants to Peru
Naturalized citizens of Peru
Argentine footballers
Peruvian footballers
Argentine people of Volga German descent
Argentine sportspeople of Spanish descent
Peruvian people of Volga German descent
Peruvian people of Spanish descent
Peru international footballers
Peruvian Primera División players
Arsenal de Sarandí footballers
Deportivo Municipal footballers
Club Universitario de Deportes footballers
Cienciano footballers
Sport Boys footballers
1999 Copa América players
2000 CONCACAF Gold Cup players
2001 Copa América players
2004 Copa América players
Association football goalkeepers
Peruvian football managers
Club Universitario de Deportes managers
Sportspeople from Chaco Province
Cusco FC managers